Villavieja del Lozoya is a municipality of the Community of Madrid, Spain.

(note: location on the map is wrong)

Municipalities in the Community of Madrid